Jamie Day is the name of:

Jamie Day (footballer, born 1979), currently assistant manager at Forest Green Rovers F.C.
Jamie Day (footballer, born 1986), currently playing for Crawley Town F.C.

See also
James Day (disambiguation)